Dr. Howard A. Kelly Park, often called Kelly Park, is a protected area which is owned by Orange County, Florida. It lies about 17 miles (27 kilometers) northwest of Orlando. It shares some of its boundaries with Wekiwa Springs State Park and Rock Springs Run State Reserve. The Rock Springs Run, a 10-mile (16 km)-long tributary of the Wekiva River, has its source near the northern boundary of Kelly Park.

Much of the park is shaded by temperate-zone trees such as red maple, American sweetgum, several species of hickory and oak, and one of the southernmost natural populations of tulip tree. Many subtropical plants are also present with cabbage palmetto prominent among them. The forests are supported by poorly drained soils which have developed from marine sands and clays. The topsoils are usually dark gray or black fine sands which are acidic (slightly so in some cases). The gray or brownish gray subsoils range in texture from sand to sandy clay, and are less acid than the topsoils. Some are moderately alkaline with free calcium carbonate.

The park's largest animals are alligator, white-tailed deer and possibly black bear. Many species of smaller animals also occur.

See also
 Howard Atwood Kelly

References
Orange County website for Kelly Park
Kelly Park in La Floridiana

Parks in Orange County, Florida